The 2001 Asian Karate Championships are the 5th edition of the Asian Karate Championships, and were held in Genting Highlands, Malaysia from 2 to 4 November 2001.

Medalists

Men

Women

Medal table

References
 Results

External links
 AKF Official Website

Asian Championships
Asian Karate Championships
Asian Karate Championships
Genting Highlands
Karate Championships